Mazal is a city of Barmer district in Rajasthan, northern India.

Mazal city is a settlement in the east part of Barmer district in the Indian state of Rajasthan. It is south of Luni river. Mazal is connected to three district border s(Pali, Jalor, Jodhpur) and is 55 km west of the city of Jodhpur.

Demographics

In the 2001 census, Majal had a population of 12,598 people (6,880 males and 5,718 females). The city urban area was 45 km2 and the population was 23,698.

References

Barmer district